Amirabad (also Romanized as Amīrābād; also known as Āmilābād and Jamīlābād) is a village in Ozomdel-e Shomali Rural District, in the Central District of Varzaqan County, East Azerbaijan Province, Iran. At the 2006 census, its population was 115, in 22 families.

References 

Towns and villages in Varzaqan County